Trichosandra is a genus of flowering plants belonging to the family Apocynaceae.

Its native range is Mascarenes.

Species:
 Trichosandra borbonica Decne.

References

Apocynaceae
Apocynaceae genera
Taxa named by Joseph Decaisne